Thomas Langdon Grace  (November 14, 1814 – February 22, 1897) was an American prelate who served as the second Roman Catholic Bishop of Saint Paul, Minnesota.

Life
Born in Charleston, South Carolina, Grace entered the seminary at Cincinnati in 1829, and, the following year, was admitted to the Dominican Order at the Priory of St. Rose in Kentucky, where he made his religious profession on 12 June 1831. In 1837 he went to Rome for further studies,  where he was ordained a priest by Cardinal Patrizi on 21 December 1839. He was the first native of South Carolina to be ordained to the priesthood. After his return to the United States in 1844 he ministered first in Kentucky, and afterwards for 13 years in Memphis, Tennessee.

Pope Pius IX appointed Grace to succeed Joseph Crétin as the Bishop of the Diocese of Saint Paul in Minnesota on January 21, 1859, for which he was consecrated on July 24, 1859. He was installed as bishop on July 29, 1859 after a year and a half long period of sede vacante in that see. A capable administrator, he served to organize the diocese, which encompassed all of Minnesota and most of the Dakotas. He focused on education and service both to the Native Americans of the region as well as to the newly-arriving immigrants.

In 1876 he welcomed Mother Mary Alfred Moes who founded the Sisters of the Congregation of Our Lady of Lourdes of the Third Order Regular of Saint Francis who established Saint Marys Hospital in Rochester which later became Mayo Clinic Hospital.

Grace resigned on July 31, 1884, succeeded by John Ireland. Shortly after that, he was named the titular bishop of Mennith. On September 24, 1889, in recognition of his service as bishop, he was appointed to the titular see of Siuna, with the personal title of archbishop.

Upon his death in Merriam Park on February 22, 1897, Grace was buried in Calvary Cemetery in Saint Paul.

Legacy
Totino-Grace High School, a Roman Catholic high school in Fridley, Minnesota, bears his name.

The city of Graceville, Minnesota was named in his honor.

Notes

1814 births
1897 deaths
Clergy from Charleston, South Carolina
American Dominicans
Dominican bishops
Roman Catholic bishops of Saint Paul
19th-century American Roman Catholic titular archbishops
Burials in Minnesota
Catholics from South Carolina